I Scream is the second studio album by Nana Kitade. It was first released at December 6, 2006 through Sony Music Japan. The album peaked at #150 on the Oricon chart. A special limited edition came with the CD, bonus alarm clock, special socks greeting card, and special Christmas card with message hand-written by Kitade herself.

Track listing

Charts

References

External links
 Official Website Sony Music Japan

Nana Kitade albums
2006 albums